Brewer's Mill is a historic industrial facility on Arkansas Highway 66, just west of the central business district of Mountain View, Arkansas.  It is a two-story wood-frame structure with flanking single-story wings, finished in weatherboard and a metal roof.  Built in 1915, it is the only surviving industrial building of its type in Stone County.  Francis Brewer built it as a grist mill, a function to which it was restored in the 1980s.

The building was listed on the National Register of Historic Places in 1985.

See also

National Register of Historic Places listings in Stone County, Arkansas

References

Grinding mills on the National Register of Historic Places in Arkansas
Buildings and structures completed in 1914
Buildings and structures in Mountain View, Arkansas
National Register of Historic Places in Stone County, Arkansas